The Italian Rhythmic Gymnastics National Championship is an annual rhythmic gymnastics national competition in Italy.

Italian Championships Medalists

References

External links
 Official Website
 Rhythmic Gymnastics Results
 Fédération Internationale de Gymnastique

 
 

Italian
Gymnastics competitions in Italy
Rhythmic gymnastics